Buescher or Büscher is a German surname.  Notable people with the surname include:

 Arnold Büscher (1899–1949), German Nazi concentration camp commandant
 Bernie Buescher, the current secretary of state in Colorado
 Chris Buescher (born 1992), NASCAR driver
 Erin Buescher Perperoglou (born 1979), an American basketball player
 James Buescher (born 1990), a NASCAR driver
 Julian Büscher (born 1993), German footballer
 Julianne Buescher (born 1965), an American actress and puppeteer
 Ulrich Büscher (born 1958), German footballer

See also
 Buescher Band Instrument Company, a former musical instrument manufacturer
 Buescher State Park, a park in Smithville, Texas
 Buscher

German-language surnames